Stone crab may refer to:

The Florida stone crab, Menippe mercenaria (a true crab)
Stone crab, Myomenippe hardwicki
Hairy Stone Crab, Lomis hirta (a false crab species of Anomura and the only member of the family Lomisidae)
King crabs, crustaceans of the family Lithodidae

Animal common name disambiguation pages